TRT Holdings is a private holding company based in Dallas, Texas, that owns hotel chain Omni Hotels, Origins Behavioral Healthcare, and many  investments in other companies. It was founded in 1989.

Management
Robert Rowling co-founded the company, and today serves as Owner, Chief Executive Officer and President.

History
TRT Holdings was founded in 1989 by Texas oil entrepreneurs Reese Rowling and his son, Robert Rowling.  They had made a fortune in the oil industry through Tana Exploration Company.
The company has made several acquisitions over the years, including the Omni Hotel chain in 1996, Gold Gym International in 2004, and Cresta Construction in Irving, Texas.

In August 2020, TRT Holdings sold Gold's Gym to German fitness company RSG Group for US$100 million 

In 2021, TRT holdings donated $50,000 to Save Austin Now, a Political Action Committee, http://www.austintexas.gov/edims/document.cfm?id=363567
In 2010, CEO Robert Rowling donated $1 million to American Crossroads, a 527 organization that primarily has supported Republican candidates in state and national elections.

In 2018, Robert Rowling donated $500,000 to Texans ARE, a Political Action Committee backing Senator Ted Cruz from Texas via their website doyouknowbeto.com.

References

External links

Omni Hotels website
Gold’s Gym website

Companies based in Irving, Texas